The 22nd Metro Manila Film Festival was held in 1996.

Amy Austria and Jomari Yllana won top honors in the 1996 Metro Manila Film Festival for winning the Best Actress and Best Actor Award respectively. Star Cinema's Magic Temple walked away most of the awards, fourteen in total including the Best Picture, and Best Director, Best Story and Best Screenplay for Peque Gallaga and Lore Reyes. The film also receives the Best Float and the Gatpuno Antonio J. Villegas Cultural Awards.

Entries

Winners and nominees

Awards
Winners are listed first and highlighted in boldface.

Special awards

Multiple awards

References

External links

Metro Manila Film Festival
MMFF
MMFF